The 1882 Fordham football team represented Fordham University during the 1882 college football season. In the inaugural season of Fordham football, the team posted a 7–1 record.

Schedule

References

Fordham
Fordham Rams football seasons
Fordham football